De Ruiter is a Dutch-language surname. In modern Dutch, ruiter indicates any equestrian. In the past, the name more specifically referred to a mounted soldier or knight. Variant spellings include De Rijter, De Ruijter, De Ruyter, Deruyter, and Ruiter:

De Ruiter
 Freddy de Ruiter (born 1969), Norwegian politician
 Job de Ruiter (1930–2015), Dutch politician
 John de Ruiter (born 1959), Canadian philosopher
 Jorrit de Ruiter (born 1986), Dutch badminton player
 Lo de Ruiter (1919–2008), Dutch politician
 Niels de Ruiter (born 1983), Dutch darts player
 Nol de Ruiter (born 1940), Dutch football player and coach
 Piet de Ruiter (1939–2014), Dutch politician
 Roy de Ruiter (born 1989), Dutch football player
 Wesley de Ruiter (born 1986), Dutch footballer
 Wietske de Ruiter (born 1970), Dutch field hockey player
 Danielle de Ruiter (born 1998), Canadian Softball player and coach

De Ruijter
 Bert de Ruijter (born 1952), Dutch blues musician known as "Leigh Blond"
 Frits de Ruijter (1917–2012), Dutch middle-distance runner

De Ruyter
 Engel de Ruyter (1649–1683), Dutch vice-admiral
 Michiel de Ruyter (1607–1676), Dutch admiral and naval hero
 Stephnie de Ruyter, New Zealand politician
 Wim de Ruyter (1918–1995), Dutch racing cyclist
 André de Ruyter (born 1968), South African business executive.

Deruyter
 Charles Deruyter (1890–1955), Belgian racing cyclist
 James DeRuyter Blackwell (1828–1901), American author and poet
 Tim DeRuyter (born 1963), American football coach
 Yves Deruyter (born 1970), Belgian DJ

Ruiter
 Bert Ruiter (born 1946), Dutch bass guitarist, record producer, and composer
 Jan Ruiter (born 1946), Dutch football goalkeeper
 Robbin Ruiter (born 1987), Dutch football goalkeeper

See also 
 12150 De Ruyter, an asteroid
 DeRuyter
 Reiter
 Reuter, the German equivalent

Dutch-language surnames
Occupational surnames